Anthony L. Krotiak (August 15, 1915 – May 8, 1945) was a United States Army soldier and a recipient of the United States military's highest decoration—the Medal of Honor—for his actions in World War II.

Biography
Krotiak joined the Army from his birth city of Chicago, Illinois, in November 1941, and by May 8, 1945, was serving as a private first class in Company I, 148th Infantry Regiment, 37th Infantry Division. On that day, in the Balete Pass, Luzon, the Philippines, he smothered the blast of a Japanese-thrown grenade with his body, sacrificing himself to protect those around him. For these actions, he was posthumously awarded the Medal of Honor the next year, on February 13, 1946.

Krotiak, aged 29 at his death, was buried in Holy Sepulchre Cemetery, Alsip, Illinois.

Medal of Honor citation
Private First Class Krotiak's official Medal of Honor citation reads:
He was an acting squad leader, directing his men in consolidating a newly won position on Hill B when the enemy concentrated small arms fire and grenades upon him and 4 others, driving them to cover in an abandoned Japanese trench. A grenade thrown from above landed in the center of the group. Instantly pushing his comrades aside and jamming the grenade into the earth with his rifle butt, he threw himself over it, making a shield of his body to protect the other men. The grenade exploded under him, and he died a few minutes later. By his extraordinary heroism in deliberately giving his life to save those of his comrades, Pfc. Krotiak set an inspiring example of utter devotion and self-sacrifice which reflects the highest traditions of the military service.

See also

List of Medal of Honor recipients for World War II

References

1915 births
1945 deaths
United States Army personnel killed in World War II
United States Army Medal of Honor recipients
People from Chicago
United States Army soldiers
World War II recipients of the Medal of Honor
American people of Polish descent
Deaths by hand grenade
Burials at Holy Sepulchre Cemetery (Alsip, Illinois)